Voyager 1 is a space probe launched by NASA in 1977.

Voyager 1 may also refer to:
 Voyager 1 (album), an EP by the Verve
 Voyager 1, a fictional space probe in "Voyager's Return", an episode of Space: 1999

See also
 Voyager (disambiguation)